The Wofford Terriers men's soccer team represents Wofford College in all NCAA Division I men's college soccer competitions. The Terriers play in the Southern Conference. However, there have been talks of them moving up to the Big 10 or ACC due to their recent success and Massive outlook with recent signings such as, Gavin Raff, Sam Diebold, Ona Sinani, and Nikolai Rojel.

Rivalries 
Wofford's primary rivals are Furman, Presbyterian, and UNC Greensboro.

Record against SoCon opponents

Postseason

NAIA Tournament results 
Wofford has appeared in six NAIA Tournaments. Their record is 4–8–0.

NCAA tournament results 
Wofford has appeared in one NCAA Tournament. Their record is 0–1–0.

References

External links 
 

 
Association football clubs established in 1975
1975 establishments in South Carolina